Anthony Dablé-Wolf (born Anthony Dablé; September 25, 1988) is a French professional American football wide receiver and coach. He has also played for the Aix-en-Provence Argonautes of the French Ligue Élite de Football Américain (LEFA), the France national team, the Lübeck Cougars, the Berlin Rebels, and the New Yorker Lions, before becoming the first player signed to the NFL from the International Player Pathway Program. After stints with the New York Giants and the Atlanta Falcons, he returned to Europe, where he played for GFL teams New Yorker Lions and Hildesheim Invaders and for the Leipzig Kings of the newly formed European League of Football (ELF).

Early years
After discovering American football at the age of 17 by playing the video game NFL Quarterback Club for the Nintendo 64, Dablé learned the sport by watching videos of wide receivers of his size on YouTube. He then tried out for, and joined, the Grenoble Centaures at the age of 19.

Career

France
He started playing football with the Grenoble Centaures in U-19 team in 2007 . While with the Centaures he won the Vice champion French Football Championship Division 2 in 2010, the France Championship Football Division 1 (Élite) in 2011 and the European Federation of American Football Cup in 2012.

He also played for the France National Team four times, in 2010, 2011, 2014 and 2015. In 2010, the team won the silver medal, losing to Germany in the EFAF European Championship. In 2011, the team placed sixth in the IFAF World Championship. In 2014, the team won the bronze medal in the EFAF European Championship. In 2015, the team placed fourth in the IFAF World Championship.

Canada
In 2012, Dablé went to the Université Laval in Canada but was not eligible to play there.

Professional career

German Football League

Berlin Rebels
Dablé joined his teammate from the France national team, Giovanni Nanguy, to play for the Lübeck Cougars, but finished the season with the Berlin Rebels. During his time with the Rebels, Dablé wore number 80. He played in six games, recorded 26 receptions for 654 yards (average of 25.2 yards per catch), scored eight touchdowns (the longest being an 83-yard catch) and nine kick returns for 237 return yards (longest kick return 55 yards). He also returned seven punts for 71 yards (longest punt return 43 yards).

New Yorker Lions
He played two seasons for the New Yorker Lions, winning the German Bowl twice (2014 and 2015), the Vice European Championship and Eurobowl during his last season.

Career statistics

National Football League

New York Giants
After posting his highlights on YouTube, Dablé was spotted by former New York Giant player Osi Umenyiora. After successful tests in England he moved to Florida on January 28, 2016 to train for the NFL Combine Regional in Minnesota. He signed a multi-year contract after a tryout on February 17, 2016. On September 3, 2016, he was released by the Giants as part of the final roster cuts.

Atlanta Falcons
On January 5, 2017, Dablé signed a reserve/future contract with the Atlanta Falcons. He was waived on September 1, 2017.

German Football League

New Yorker Lions (second stint)
Dablé-Wolf returned to the GFL by signing with the New Yorker Lions on May 23, 2018.

Hildesheim Invaders
In December 2018 the Hildesheim Invaders signed Dablé-Wolf for the 2019 season.

European League of Football

German Knights 1367/Leipzig Kings
In February 2021, it was announced that new franchise German Knights 1367, out of the newly formed European League of Football, has signed Dablé-Wolf for the 2021 season. After that team did not join the league for its inaugural season, he was instead transferred to the Leipzig Kings. On April 14, 2022 his extension was announced after being signed by the Allgäu Comets for their 2022 season.

Personal life
He is multilingual, speaking French, English and German.

References

External links
 Giants profile

1988 births
Living people
French players of American football
New York Giants players
Atlanta Falcons players
German Football League players
Place of birth missing (living people)
French expatriate sportspeople in Germany
French expatriate sportspeople in the United States
International Player Pathway Program participants
Expatriate players of American football
Leipzig Kings players